Motta d'Affermo (Sicilian: Motta d'Affermu) is a comune (municipality) in the Province of Messina in the Italian region Sicily, located about  east of Palermo and about  west of Messina.

Motta d'Affermo borders the following municipalities: Pettineo, Reitano, Tusa.

Main sights
Mother Church of S. Maria degli Angeli (1380, rebuilt in 1453)
Church of St. Roch (1657)
Castle (12th-13th centuries)
Palazzo Minneci (17th century)
Torremuzza Tower (13th century)
Church of St. Peter

References

External links
 Official website

Cities and towns in Sicily